The brown-streaked flycatcher (Muscicapa williamsoni) is a species of bird in the family Muscicapidae.
It is found in southern Myanmar, southern Thailand, northern peninsular Malaysia, and northeast Borneo. Some authorities consider it to be a subspecies of the Asian brown flycatcher.
The species has a rufescent plumage in the breeding season and then becomes drab.
The species name is after the collector Sir Walter James Franklin Williamson.

References

Muscicapa
Birds of Southeast Asia
Birds described in 1957
Taxa named by Herbert Girton Deignan